Ashley Barrow (born 11 October 1962) is an Australian cricket umpire. He has stood in domestic matches in the 2016–17 Sheffield Shield season and the 2016–17 Big Bash League season. He has also stood as an umpire in international matches between the Australian and England women's cricket teams.

References

External links
 

1962 births
Living people
Australian cricket umpires
Sportspeople from Melbourne